Dick Platt was an English footballer who played as a right back for Huyton Quarry, Tranmere Rovers and Northampton Town. He made 193 appearances for Tranmere.

References

Tranmere Rovers F.C. players
Northampton Town F.C. players
Association football fullbacks
English footballers